The consensus 1955 College Basketball All-American team, as determined by aggregating the results of six major All-American teams.  To earn "consensus" status, a player must win honors from a majority of the following teams: the Associated Press, Look Magazine, The United Press International, the Newspaper Enterprise Association (NEA), Collier's Magazine and the International News Service.

1955 Consensus All-America team

Individual All-America teams

AP Honorable Mention:

 Jesse Arnelle, Penn State
 Denver Brackeen, Ole Miss
 Art Bunte, Utah
 Carl Cain, Iowa
 Ed Conlin, Fordham
 Walter Devlin, George Washington
 Frank Ehmann, Northwestern
 Bill Evans, Kentucky
 Ed Fleming, Niagara
 Swede Halbrook, Oregon State
 Jerry Harper, Alabama
 Joe Holup, George Washington
 Johnny Horan, Dayton
 Rod Hundley, West Virginia
 Cleo Littleton, Wichita State
 Bob McKeen, California
 Chuck Mencel, Minnesota
 Warren Mills, Richmond
 Johnny Moore, UCLA
 Jerry Mullen, San Francisco
 Dick O'Neal, Texas Christian
 Bob Patterson, Tulsa
 Art Quimby, Connecticut
 Jim Reed, Texas Tech
 Bill Ridley, Illinois
 Ken Sears, Santa Clara
 Jack Stephens, Notre Dame
 Ron Tomsic, Stanford
 Jack Twyman, Cincinnati
 Dick Welsh, Southern California

See also
 1954–55 NCAA men's basketball season

References

NCAA Men's Basketball All-Americans
All-Americans